Statistics of Swiss National League A in the 1996–97 football season.

Overview
It was contested by 12 teams, and FC Sion won the championship.

First stage

Table

Results

Second stage

Championship group

Table

Results

Promotion/relegation group

Table

Results

Sources
 Switzerland 1996–97 at RSSSF

Swiss Football League seasons
Swiss
1996–97 in Swiss football